This is a list of contemporary art galleries, i.e., commercial galleries for-profit, privately-owned businesses dealing in artworks by contemporary artists born after 1945.

Galleries on this list meet the following criteria:
The gallery has played a major role in career of significant or well-known artists born after 1945
The gallery has won significant critical attention
The gallery is widely cited by peers

List of contemporary art galleries

Intercontinental

From US 
 Blum & Poe (Tim Blum and Jeff Poe), Los Angeles since 1994, New York since 2014, Tokyo since 2014
 Gavin Brown's Enterprise, New York since 1994, Roma since 2015
 Galerie Philia, since 2015: New York, Mexico, Geneva, New York and Singapore
 Gagosian Gallery, Los Angeles since 1979, New York since 1989, London since 2000, Roma since 2007, Athena since 2009, Paris and Geneva since 2010, Hong Kong since 2011, Le Bourget since 2012, San Francisco since 2016, Basel since 2019
 Barbara Gladstone Gallery, New York since 1979, Brussels since 2011
 Marian Goodman Gallery, New York since 1977, Paris since 1999, London since 2014
 Lehmann Maupin (Rachel Lehmann and David Maupin), New York since 1996, Hong Kong since 2013, Seoul since 2017, London since 2020
 Pace Gallery (Arne Glimcher et Marc Glimcher), New York since 1963, London since 2012, Hong Kong since 2014, Palo Alto since 2016, Seoul since 2017, Geneva since 2018
 Skarstedt Fine Art (Per Skarstedt), New York since 1994, London since 2012
 Von Lintel Gallery, Munich 1993, New York since 1999, Los Angeles since 2014
 David Zwirner Gallery, New York since 1993, London since 2012, Hong Kong since 2017, Paris since 2019

From Commonwealth 
 Flowers Gallery (Angela Flowers), London since 1970, Los Angeles from 1998 to 2003, New York since 2003, Hong Kong since 2020
 Goodman Gallery, Johannesburg since 1966, Cape Town, London since 2019
 Haunch of Venison (Harry Blain and Graham Southern), London from 2002 to 2013, Zurich from 2005 to 2009, Berlin from 2007 to 2018, New York from 2008 to 2013
 Simon Lee Gallery, London since 2002, Hong Kong since 2012, New York since 2014
 Lisson Gallery, (Nicholas Logsdail), London since 1967, New York since 2016, Shanghai since 2019
 Marlborough Fine Art, London since 1946, New York since 1963, Madrid since 1992, Santiago since 1995, Barcelona since 2012
 Everard Read Gallery, Johannesburg since 1913, Cape Town since 1996, London since 2016
 White Cube, (Jay Jopling), London since 1993, Hong Kong since 2012

From Europe 
 Galerie Buchholz (Daniel Buchholz & Christopher Müller), Cologne since 1986, Berlin since 2008, New York since 2015
 Galerie Ceysson & Bénétière (François Ceysson et Loïc Bénétière), Saint-Etienne since 2006, Luxembourg since 2008, Paris since 2009, Geneva since 2012, New York since 2017
 Galleria Continua, (Mario Cristiani, Lorenzo Fiaschi et Maurizio Rigillo), San Gimignano since 1990, Beijing since 2005, Les Moulins since 2007, La Havana since 2015, Roma since 2020
 Galleria Massimo De Carlo, Milan since 1987, London since 2009, Hong Kong since 2016
 Hauser & Wirth, (Iwan Wirth et Manuela Hauser), Zurich since 1992, London since 2003, New York since 2009, Somerset since 2014, Los Angeles since 2016, Hong Kong since 2018, Gstaad since 2019
 Marc Jancou Contemporary, Zurich from 1991 to 1996, London from 1996 to 2003, NYC since 2003, Geneva from 2011
 Yvon Lambert Gallery, Paris from 1966 to 2014, New York from 2003 to 2014
 Galerie Daniel Lelong (fr) , Paris and Zurich since 1981, New York since 1985
 Galerie Nordenhake (Claes Nordenhake) (sv), Malmö from 1973 to 1986, Stockholm since 1986, Berlin since 2000, Mexico since 2018
 Galerie Emmanuel Perrotin, Paris since 1990, Hong Kong since 2012, New York since 2013, Seoul since 2016, Tokyo since 2017, Shanghai since 2018
 Galerie Almine Rech, Paris since 1997, Brussels since 2007, London since 2014, New York since 2016, Shanghai since 2019
 Sprüth Magers (Monika Sprüth et Philomene Magers), Cologne since 1983, London since 2003, Berlin since 2008, Los Angeles since 2016
 Galerie Eva Presenhuber, Zurich since 2003, New York since 2017
 Galerie Michael Werner, Berlin (1963-1969), Cologne (1969-1990), New York since 1990, Trebbin since 2009, London since 2012

From MENA 
 Dvir Gallery (Dvir Intrator), Tel Aviv since 1982, Brussels since 2016
 Gazelli Art House (Mila Askarova), Baku since 2003, London since 2012
 The Pill Gallery (Suela Cennet), Istanbul since 2016

From Asia 
 HdM Gallery (Hadrien de Montferrand), Beijing since 2009, Hangzhou since 2013, London since 2018

United States

Transmetropolitan 
 Marianne Boesky Gallery, New York since 1996, Aspen since 2017
 Tanya Bonakdar Gallery, New York since 1994, Los Angeles since 2018
 Richard Gray Gallery, Chicago since 1963, New York since 1997
 Phyllis Kind Gallery, Chicago from 1967 to 1998, New York from 1975 to 2009
 Michele Maccarone Gallery, New York since 2001, Los Angeles since 2015
 Team Gallery, (José Freire and Lisa Ruyter), New York since 1996, Los Angeles since 2014
 Pentimenti Gallery, (Christine Pfister), Philadelphia (since 2000)

Chicago 
 Kavi Gupta Gallery, since 2000
 Serbian American Museum, established in 1952, defunct in 2016

Denver 
 Robischon Gallery (Jim Robischon & Jennifer Doran), since 1976

Los Angeles 
 Ace Gallery (Douglas Chrismas), since 1966
 Rosamund Felsen Gallery, since 1978
 Honor Fraser Gallery, since 2006
 David Kordansky Gallery, since 2003
 Margo Leavin Gallery from 1970 to 2013
 L.A. Louver Gallery, since 1976
 Maloney Fine Art, since 2006
 Patrick Painter Gallery, since 1997
 Regen Projects (Stuart Regen and Shaun Caley), since 1989
 Vielmetter Los Angeles Projects, since 2000

Miami 
 Fredric Snitzer Gallery, since 1977

Montana 
 Echo Arts, since 2020
 Eli Ridgway Gallery, since 2020

New York 
 ACA Galleries since 1932
 Alexander and Bonin (Carolyn Alexander and Ted Bonin) since 1995
 Friedman Benda Gallery, since 2007
 Mary Boone Gallery, from 1977 to 2019
 Bykert Gallery, from 1966-1975, run by (Klaus Kertess, 1940-2016) 
 Leo Castelli Gallery (died in 1999), since 1957
 Paula Cooper Gallery, since 1968
 Charles Cowles Gallery, from 1980 to 2009.
 Cheim & Read, since 1997
 James Cohan Gallery, since 1999
 CRG Gallery from 1990 to 2017
 D'Amelio Terras Gallery (Christopher D'Amelio and Lucien Terras), from 1996 to 2012
 Elizabeth Dee Gallery, from 1998 to 2018
 Eden Fine Art, (Cathia Klimovsky) since 1997
 Andre Emmerich Gallery (died in 2007), since 1959
 Wally Findlay Galleries from 1870 to the present.
 Green Gallery with Richard Bellamy (died in 1998), from 1960 to 1965.
 Sidney Janis Gallery (died in 1989) since 1948
 Karma Gallery (Brendan Dugan), since 2011
 Kasmin Gallery, since 1989
 Sean Kelly Gallery, since 1991
 Anton Kern Gallery, since 1996
 Knoedler Gallery, from 1846 to 2011
 Koenig & Clinton Gallery (Leo Koenig and Margaret Liu Clinton) from 1999 to 2019
 Samuel M. Kootz Gallery from 1945-1966; Samuel Kootz (died 1982) 
 Luhring Augustine Gallery, (Lawrence Luhring et Roland Augustine), since 1985
 Matthew Marks Gallery, since 1991
 Robert Miller Gallery (died in 2011), from 1977 to 2016
 Jason McCoy Gallery, since 1982
 Metro Pictures Gallery, (Janelle Reiring et Helene Winer), since 1980
 Greene Naftali Gallery (Carol Greene and Gloria Naftali), since 1995
 Nahmad Contemporary Gallery, (Joe Nahmad), since 2013
 Annina Nosei Gallery, from 1980 to 2006
 Pace Gallery, since 1960.
 Betty Parsons Gallery from 1946 to 1982, run by (Betty Parsons, 1900-1982)
 Salander-O'Reilly Galleries, from 1974 to 2007.
 Friederich Petzel Gallery, since 1994
 PPOW Gallery (Penny Pilkington & Wendy Olsoff), since 1983
 Andrea Rosen Gallery since 1990
 Salon 94 (Jeanne Greenberg Rohatyn), since 2002
 Tony Shafrazi Gallery from 1979 to 2014
 Jack Shainman Gallery, since 1984
 Holly Solomon Gallery (died in 2002), from 1975 to 2002
 Sonnabend Gallery (died in 2007), from 1970 to 2014
 Reena Spaulings Fine Art, since 2005
 Edward Thorp Gallery, since 1974
 Tibor de Nagy Gallery since 1950, (Tibor de Nagy died in 1993)
 Jack Tilton Gallery (died in 2017), since 1983
 Sperone Westwater, (Gian Enzo Sperone et Angela Westwater), since 1975
 Stephen Haller Gallery, from 1986 to 2013.
 Stux Gallery, Boston (1980-1988), New York since 1986
 The Project (Christian Haye), from 1998 to 2009
 Viana Art (André Viana), since 1996
 David Whitney Gallery, from 1969 to 1972
 Willard Gallery, from 1936 to 1987.
 Chase Contemporary, from 2017.

Saint Louis 
 David Bruno Gallery, New York (1983-2005) then Saint Louis since 2005

San Francisco 
 Gallery Paule Anglim, since 1972
 Berggruen Gallery, since 1970
 The Laundry SF, since 2015

Seattle 
 Greg Kucera Gallery, since 1983
 Donald Young Gallery, from 1983 to 2014

Latin America

Brazil 
 Baró Galeria, São Paulo since 2010
 Galeria Thomas Cohn, São Paulo from 1983 to 2011
 Galería Fortes D'Aloia & Gabriel, São Paulo since 1992
 Galería Luisa Strina, São Paulo since 1974

Colombia 
 Alonso Garces Galeria (Alonso Garces and Aseneth Velázquez), Bogota since 1977

Mexico 
 Kurimanzutto (Mónica Manzutto and José Kuri), Mexico City since 1999, New York since 2018
 Galería OMR (Patricia Ortiz Monasterio and Jaime Riestra), Mexico City since 1983

Commonwealth

Australia 
 Christine Abrahams Gallery, Melbourne from 1980 to 2008
 Annandale Galleries (Bill and Anne Gregory), Sydney since 1991
 Philip Bacon Galleries, Fortitude Valley since 1974
 Michael Carr Gallery, Woollahra from 1994 to 2007
 Robin Gibson Gallery, Sydney since 1976
 Rex Irwin Gallery, Woollahra from 1976 to 2012
 Liverpool Street Gallery (James Erskine), Sydney since 2003
 Niagara Galleries (Peter Gant and William Nuttall), Melbourne since 1978
 Roslyn Oxley9 Gallery, Sydney since 1982
 Anna Schwartz Gallery, Melbourne since 1986

Canada

New Zealand 
 Peter McLeavey Gallery (died in 2015), Wellington from 1968 to 2015

South Africa 
 Afronova Gallery (Henri Vergon and Emilie Démon), Johannesburg since 2005
 Stevenson Gallery (Michael Stevenson and David Brodie), Cape Town since 2003, Johannesburg since 2008

United Kingdom 
 Sadie Coles HQ, London since 1997
 Pilar Corrias Gallery, London since 2008
 Corvi-Mora, London since 1996
 Cristea Roberts Gallery (Alan Cristea and David Cleaton-Roberts), London since 1995
 Laurent Delaye Gallery, London since 1996
 Faggionato Fine Arts (Anne Faggionato), London from 1994 to 2015
 Stephen Friedman Gallery, London since 1995
 Frith Street Gallery (Jane Hamlyn), London since 1989
 Michael Goedhuis Gallery, London since 2002
 Mica Gallery, London since 2007
 Greengrassi (Cornelia Grassi), London since 1997
 Grosvenor Vadehra Gallery, London since 2006
 Bernard Jacobson Gallery, London since 1969
 Modern Art (Stuart Shave), London since 1998
 The Modern Institute, Glasgow since 1997
 October Gallery (Chili Hawes), London since 1979
 Anthony d'Offay Gallery, London from 1965 to 2001
 Maureen Paley Gallery, London since 1984
 Piccadilly Gallery, London from 1953 to 2007
 Portland Gallery (Tom Hewlett), London since 1984
 Saatchi Gallery, London since 1985, turned into a museum in 2010
 Karsten Schubert Gallery (died en 2019), London since 1986
 The Sladmore Gallery, London since 1965
 Whitechapel Gallery, London since 1901 (not-for-profit educational charity)

Europe

European 
 Thomas Dane Gallery, London since 2004, Naples since 2018
 Galerie Max Hetzler, Stuttgart (1974-1983), Cologne (1983-1993), Berlin since 1993, Paris since 2014, London since 2018
 Galerie Kamel Mennour, Paris since 1999, London since 2016
 Monitor, (Paola Capata), Roma since 2003, Lisbon since 2017, Pereto since 2019
 Victoria Miro Gallery, London since 1985, Venice since 2017
 Galerie Nathalie Obadia, Paris since 1993, Brussels since 2008
 Galerie Thaddaeus Ropac, Salzburg since 1983, Paris since 1990, Pantin since 2012, London since 2017
 Galerie Daniel Templon, Paris since 1966, Brussels since 2013
 Galerie Michel Rein, Tours from 1992 to 2000, Paris since 2000, Brussels since 2013
 Tornabuoni Art, (Roberto Casamonti), Florence since 1981, Crans Montana since 1993, Milan since 1995, Forte Dei Marmi since 2004, Paris since 2009, London since 2015

Austria 
 Galerie Meyer Kainer, Vienna since 1999
 Christine König Galerie, Vienna since 1990
 Galerie Ursula Krinzinger (de), Vienna since 1971
 Galerie Peter Pakesch, Vienna from 1981 to 1993

Belgium 
 Galerie Aeroplastics contemporary (Jerome Jacobs), Brussels since 1998
 Galerie Fortlaan 17, Ghent, from 1989 to 2014
 Galerie Xavier Hufkens, Brussels since 1987
 Galerie Rodolphe Janssen, Brussels since 1991
 Galerie Greta Meert, Brussels since 1988
 Galerie Mulier Mulier, Knokke since 1988
 Guy Pieters Galleries, Knokke-Heist since 1981
 Galerie Micheline Szwajcer, Antwerp since 1981
 Zeno X Gallery (Frank Demaegd), Antwerp since 1981

Denmark 
 Galleri Jens Faurschou, Copenhagen since 1986, turned into a foundation in 2011
 David Risley Gallery, Copenhagen from 2003 to 2018

France 
 Galerie 1900-2000, (Marcel Fleiss), Paris since 1981 (joined by son David Fleiss since 1991)
 Galerie Art : Concept (fr) (Olivier Antoine), Nice frome 1992 to 1997, Paris since 1997
 Galerie Chantal Crousel (fr), Paris since 1980
 Galerie Farideh Cadot, Paris since 1976
 Galerie Gabrielle Maubrie (fr), Paris from 1977 to 2019
 Galerie Durand-Dessert, Paris from 1975 to 2002
 Galerie Laurent Godin, Paris, since 2005
 Galerie Hussenot, Paris since 1985
 Galerie kreo (fr) (Clémence and Didier Krzentowski), Paris since 1999
 Galerie Hervé Loevenbruck, Paris since 2001
 Galerie Loft (Jean-François Roudillon), Paris since 1985
 Galerie Magnin-A (André Magnin (fr)), Paris since 2009
 Galerie Gabrielle Maubrie (fr), Paris from 1977 to 2019
 Galerie mfc-Michèle Didier, Paris since 2012 (Brussels since 1987)
 Galerie Jérôme de Noirmont, Paris from 1994 to 2013
 Galerie Denise René (died in 2012), Paris since 1944
 Galerie Georges-Philippe et Nathalie Vallois, Paris since 1990
 Galerie Laurent Strouk (fr), Paris since 1986
 Galerie Suzanne Tarasiève, Paris since 2003

Germany 
 Arndt & Partner (Matthias Arndt), Berlin since 1994
 Berlinische Galerie, Berlin 
 Galerie Isabella Bortolozzi, Berlin since 2004
 Galerie von Braunbehrens (Frank Molliné), Munich from 1978 to 2014, then Stuttgart since 2015
 Galerie Gisela Capitain (de), Cologne since 1986, Berlin since 2008
 Galerie Mehdi Chouakri, Berlin since 1996
 Contemporary Fine Arts (Bruno Brunnet and Nicole Hackert), Berlin since 1992
 Galerie Konrad Fischer, Dusseldorf since 1967, Berlin since 2007
 Barbara Gross Galerie (de), Munich from 1988 to 2020
 Jablonka Galerie (Rafael Jablonka) (de), Cologne since 1988
 Galerie Dennis Kimmerich, Düsseldorf from 2004 to 2010, NYC from 2010 to 2013, then Berlin since 2013
 Galerie Bernd Klüser (de), Munich since 1978
 Galerie Kraupa-Tuskany Zeidler (Amadeo Kraupa-Tuskany and Nadine Zeidler), Berlin since 2011
 Galerie Achim Kubinski, Stuttgart from 1979 to 1997
 Galerie Löhrl (de), Mönchengladbach since 1975
 Galerie Hans Mayer (de), Dusseldorf since 1971
 Galerie Nagel Draxler (de) (Christian Nagel & Saskia Draxler), Cologne since 1990, Berlin since 2002, Munich since 2019
 Galerie Neu (Alexander Schroeder and Thilo Wermke), Berlin since 1994
 Neugerriemschneider (Tim Neuger & Burkhard Riemschneider), Berlin since 1994
 Alexander Ochs Private, Berlin since 1997
 Produzentengalerie, Hamburg since 1973
 Galerie Aurel Scheibler, Cologne from 1991 to 2006, then Berlin since 2006

Greece 
 Bernier-Eliades Gallery (Jean Bernier & Marina Eliades), Athens since 1977

Italy 
 Galleria Alfonso Artiaco, Naples since 1986
 Galleria Cardi (Renato Cardi), Milan since 1972
 Galleria Raffaella Cortese, Milan since 1995
 Galleria Dep Art (Antonio Addamiano), Milan since 2006
 Galleria Emi Fontana, Milan from 1992 to 2009
 Galleria Paolo Gentili, Florence since 1991
 Galleria Giò Marconi, Milan since 1990
 Primo Marella Gallery, Milan since 2012
 Galleria Massimo Minini, Brescia since 1973
 Galleria Valentina Moncada, Rome since 1990
 Galleria Francesca Minini, Milan since 2006
 Galleria Lia Rumma, Naples since 1971, Milan since 1999
 Studio la Città (Hélène de Franchis), Verone since 1969
 Wizard Gallery (former Federico-Luger - FL Gallery), Milan since 2005

Luxembourg 
 Zidoun-Bossuyt Gallery (Nordine Zidoun and Audrey Bossuyt), Luxembourg since 2008

Netherlands 
 Andriesse & Eyck Gallery (Paul Andriesse & Zsa-Zsa Eyck), Amsterdam since 1984
 Art & Project (Geert van Beijeren & Adriaan van Ravesteijn), Amsterdam from 1968 to 2001

Portugal 
 Galeria Presença, Porto since 1995

Spain 
 ADN Galería (Miguel Angel Sánchez), Barcelona since 2003
 Galería Juana de Aizpuru, Madrid since 1983
 Galería Elba Benítez, Madrid since 1990
 Galería Javier Lopez & Fer Frances, Madrid since 1996
 Galería Angel Romero, Madrid from 1985 to 2011

Sweden 
 Lars Bohman Gallery, Stockholm since 1982
 Galleri Magnus Karlsson (sv), Stockholm since 1997

Switzerland 
 Thomas Ammann Fine Art, Zurich since 1977
 Galerie Bruno Bischofberger, Zurich since 1963
 Blondeau & Cie (Marc Blondeau), Geneva since 1987
 Galerie Andrea Caratsch, Zurich since 2006, St. Moritz since 2010
 Gowen Contemporary (Laura Gowen), Geneva since 2006
 Galerie Peter Kilchmann, Zurich since 1992
 Galerie Alice Pauli (fr), Lausanne since 1962
 Annemarie Verna Galerie, Zurich since 1969

Middle East and North Africa

Israël 
 Zemack Contemporary Art (Shai Zemack), Tel Aviv since 2010

Turkey 
 Arter since 2010
 Borusan Contemporary
 Dirimart (Hazer Özil), Istanbul since 2002
 İstanbul Modern since 2004
 Pera Museum
 Sakıp Sabancı Museum

Asia

Asian 
 Pearl Lam Gallery, Hong Kong since 1992, Shanghai since 2005, Singapore since 2014
 ShanghART Gallery (Lorenz Helbling), Shanghai since 1996, Beijing since 2008, Singapore since 2012

China 
 Hanart TZ Gallery (Johnson Chang), Hong Kong since 1983
 Kwai Fung Hin Art Gallery (Catherine Kwai), Hong Kong since 1991
 Edouard Malingue Gallery, Hong Kong since 2010, Shanghai since 2016
 Schoeni Art Gallery (Manfred Schoeni and Nicole Schoeni), Hong Kong since 1992
 Soka Art Tainan (Hsiao Fuyuan), Tainan since 1992, Beijing since 2001, Taipei
 Spurs Gallery (Jia Wei and Sherry La), Beijing since 2005
 Yan Gallery (Fong Yuk Yan), Hong Kong since 2001

India 
 Gallery Nature Morte (Peter Nagy (artist)), New Delhi since 1997, Calcutta from 2006 to 2009, Berlin from 2008 to 2014

Japan 
 SCAI the Bathhouse (Masami Shiraishi), Tokyo since 1993
 Tomio Koyama Gallery, Tokyo since 1996
 Gallery Nomart (Satoshi Hayashi), Osaka since 1999
 Urano Gallery (Mutsumi Urano), Tokyo since 2007

Philippines 
 Finale Art File (Vita Sarenas), Makati since 1982

Taiwan 
 Michael Ku Gallery, Taipei since 2008
 Lin & Lin Gallery, Taipei since 1992

See also
Contemporary art gallery
Art gallery

Further reading

References

Types of art museums and galleries